Santiago Gabriel Ormeño Zayas  (born 4 February 1994) is a professional footballer who plays as a forward for Liga MX club Juárez, on loan from Guadalajara. Born in Mexico, he represents the Peru national team.

Personal life
Ormeño is the grandson of the Peruvian footballer Walter Ormeño, who represented the Peru national team in the 40s and 50s. He is a dual citizen of Mexico and Peru.

International career
Ormeño was selected by Peru for the 2021 Copa América and made his debut on 20 June 2021 in a game against Colombia.

Career statistics

Club

International

Honours
León
Leagues Cup: 2021

References

External links
 
 

1994 births
Living people
Footballers from Mexico City
Citizens of Peru through descent
Peruvian footballers
Peru international footballers
2021 Copa América players
Mexican footballers
Mexican people of Peruvian descent
Association football forwards
Pioneros de Cancún footballers
Cusco FC footballers
Club Puebla players
Liga MX players
Peruvian Primera División players
Peruvian people of Mexican descent